Sociedad Deportiva Formentera is a football team based in Sant Francesc Xavier, Formentera in the Balearic Islands. The team plays in Segunda División RFEF – Group 3. The club's home ground is the Estadi Municipal, which has a capacity of 500 spectators.

History
Founded in 1971, in 1979–80 the club took part in Tercera División, ending in relegation. It also entered the year's Copa del Rey, dispatching UD Porreras 3–2 on aggregate in the first round before falling 2–0 to Atlético Baleares in the second round.

Formentera returned to the fourth division in 2012, after winning the regional Preferente. In 2015–16, they reached the second round of the cup with a 2–1 win at Segunda División B team CD Alcoyano, and a year later they reached the last 32 of the competition before a 14–2 aggregate loss to La Liga team and UEFA Europa League holders Sevilla FC.

In that 2016–17 season, Formentera promoted for the first time ever to the third division after defeating Alavés B in the promotion play-offs. The following season, they reached again the round of 32 of the Copa del Rey, where they eliminated top level club Athletic Bilbao after winning in San Mamés with a goal in the sixth minute of stoppage time; in the last 16 they were eliminated by another top-flight Basque team, Deportivo Alavés, and the league season ended with instant relegation.

Season to season

1 season in Segunda División B
1 season in Segunda División RFEF
9 seasons in Tercera División

Current squad
.

References

External links
Official website
Club & Stadium History at Estadios de España 

Football clubs in the Balearic Islands
Formentera
1971 establishments in Spain
Association football clubs established in 1971